Srungavarapukota popularly known by its abbreviated form S.Kota is a neighbourhood in the district of Vizianagaram, India. S.Kota is located on Visakhapatnam – Araku road.
The town was upgraded from gram panchayat to Nagar Panchayat in the year 2011.

Location and geography

Srungavarapukota is located about 46 km from Visakhapatnam Airport and about 38 km from Vizianagaram railway station. It lies to the north-west of Visakhapatnam City and is loosely bordered by Kothavalasa to the south and Vizianagaram to the east, Salur to the north, Araku to the west.

It is at an average altitude of 70 meters (232 feet).

Srungavarapukota railway station is located on Kothavalasa-Kirandul line under East Coast Railway, Indian Railways.

Demography
 census, S. Kota Mandal had a population of 74,413. Males constitute 36,586 and females 37,827 of the population. This phenomenon of females outnumbering males is an unusual phenomenon. The average literacy rate is 59%. Male literacy rate is 70% and that of females 48%.

There are 40 revenue villages and 26 gram panchayats in Srungavarapukota Mandal.

Politics
Srungavarapukota (Assembly constituency) is reserved for General. There are 1,42,285 registered voters in this constituency.

Transport

S.Kota is located on Visakhapatnam - Araku road. APS RTC runs bus services from S.Kota depot to all major bus station in the District.

References

External links 

Towns in Vizianagaram district
Mandal headquarters in Vizianagaram district